Jimmy Ashall (born 13 December 1933) is an English former footballer who played in the Football League for Leeds United.

External links
 

English footballers
English Football League players
1933 births
Living people
Leeds United F.C. players
People from North East Derbyshire District
Footballers from Derbyshire
Association football defenders